Shakespeare Schools Foundation (SSF) is a cultural education charity  in England, Wales, Scotland and Northern Ireland. Every year, up to 30,000 young people from across the UK representing all communities and backgrounds  take part in the world's largest youth drama festival, the Shakespeare Schools Festival.  Since 2000, SSF has worked with over 250,000 young people and their teachers.

Mission 

SSF is a cultural education charity. Its mission is to give young people skills that help them succeed in life.

Through tailored programmes, curriculum resources and standalone workshops, the charity works to improve teamwork and educational attainment. SSF works with every type of school in the UK. They engage diverse groups, including those attending special schools and from minority ethnic backgrounds, and is working to reach those living in areas of deprivation.

Values
 Aspirational
 Experiential
 Diverse
 Uniting
 Thrilling
 Transformative

Activities

The Shakespeare Schools Festival 
SSF's flagship project is the world's largest youth drama festival. The charity trains teachers and young people in an active and ambitious way of working with Shakespeare. Every autumn, months of preparation culminate in over 1,000 performances from primary, secondary and special schools in over 130 theatres nationwide. SSF trains, supports, encourages and produces - making the creative, technical and artistic work of the schools possible.

Workshops and Curriculum Resources 
SSF creates curriculum resources and runs standalone workshops for students, teachers and businesses. For over 15 years, SSF has given participants tools applicable in classrooms and staff rooms, offices and boardrooms.

History 

In 2016, Shakespeare Schools Festival became Shakespeare Schools Foundation. See Shakespeare Schools Festival for previous history.

2016 

27,550 young people from 1,093 schools performed abridged versions of Shakespeare plays in 131 theatres across the UK as part of the 16th Shakespeare Schools Festival.

To celebrate the 400th anniversary of Shakespeare's death, SSF staged performances at 10 Downing Street, Westminster Abbey, a West End Gala, and at the Queen's 90th birthday. SSF also hosted the Trial of Hamlet fundraiser. Tried by QCs in front of Lady Justice Hallett, evidence from Gertrude, played by Meera Syal, Claudius, played by Tom Conti, and Player King, played by Lee Mack, was insufficient to find Hamlet, played by John Heffernan, guilty for the murder of Polonius. SSF's young performers shared the stage with the cast.

2018 
In 2018, the Foundation was awarded the Praemium Imperiale Grant for Young Artists, having been selected for the award by Chancellor of the University of Oxford and former Chairman of the BBC Trust, Chris Patten.

In April 2018, SSF hosted another West End fundraiser, "Trial of Richard III", this time at the Novello Theatre. The cast included Hugh Dennis, David Oakes, Kae Alexander, Lady Justice Hallett, Ian Winter QC and John Kelsey Fry QC with contributions from Ed Vaizey MP, Maggie Aderin Pocock and Tim Campbell.

Patrons
 Jenny Agutter
 Nick Allott
 Simon Russell Beale
 Ruby Bentall
 Dame Judi Dench
 Hugh Dennis
 Ralph Fiennes
 Jamila Gavin
 John Heffernan
 Sir Nicholas Hytner
 Paterson Joseph
 Kwame Kwei-Armah
 Francesca Martinez
 Philip Pullman
 Lord Puttnam
 Matthew Rhys
 Michael Rosen
 Sir Tom Stoppard
 Dame Harriet Walter

Trustees
 James Dray (Chair)
 Guy Davies (Treasurer)
 James Hadley
 Geraint Talfan-Davies OBE

Education Advisors
 Colin Hall
 Dame Alison Peacock

References

External links
Official Website

Educational charities based in the United Kingdom